The Education Law Association (ELA) is a professional association founded in 1954. It offers neutral information regarding the present legal problems which could have impact on education and the people related to the education in public and private K-12 schools, universities, and colleges to its professional members. Its members comprise scholars and practitioners, including attorneys, professors, administrators, students, public officials, advocates, education writers, from plaintiff- as well as defense-side and labor as well as management. ELA is the publisher of books about education law that are used as resources in the field and as textbooks in university courses.

References 

Legal organizations based in the United States
Legal education in the United States
Educational organizations based in the United States
United States education law